PLT may stand for:
 Patent Law Treaty
 Plantronics, stock symbol
 Power line communication or power line telecommunications
 Princeton Large Torus, a nuclear fusion reactor
 Programming language theory, in computer science
 PLT Scheme, a programming language